The 2015–16 Segona Divisió, or Lliga Biosphere, is the 17th season of second-tier football in Andorra. The season began on 13 September 2015 and will end on 8 May 2016.

Personnel and sponsorship

Format
This season, the league will consist of fourteen teams. Teams will play each other twice for a total of 26 matches each. The league champion will be promoted to next season's Primera Divisió. The second placed team will play a play-off match for a spot in next season's Primera Divisió. The five "B" teams can not be promoted.

League table

Results

Topscorers

References

External links
 

Segona Divisió seasons
2015–16 in Andorran football
Andorra